Meuse is a department in northeast France, named after the River Meuse. Meuse is part of the current region of Grand Est and is landlocked and borders by the French departments of Ardennes, Marne, Haute-Marne, Vosges, Meurthe-et-Moselle, and Belgium to the north. Parts of Meuse belong to Parc naturel régional de Lorraine. It had a population of 184,083 in 2019. Front lines in trench warfare during World War I ran varying courses through the department and it hosted an important battle/offensive in 1916 in and around Verdun.

History
Meuse is one of the original 83 departments created during the French Revolution on 4 March 1790, by order of the National Constituent Assembly. The new departments were to be uniformly administered and approximately equal to one another in size and population. The department was created from the former provinces of Barrois (area of Bar-le-Duc) and Three Bishoprics (area of Verdun).

From about 500 AD, the Franks controlled this part of northeastern France, and the Carolingian Empire was the last stage of their rule. The Carolingian territories were divided into three sections in 843 at the Treaty of Verdun, and the area that is now the department of Meuse became part of Middle Francia. The new ruler was Lothair I, and on his death in 855, his territory north of the Alps was passed to his second son Lothair II, after whom the hitherto nameless territory was called Lotharingia, which name eventually evolved into the modern Lorraine. Lothair II died without legitimate heirs and Lotharingia was divided into east and west parts. The king of East Francia, Louis the German, received the eastern part and Charles the Bald, king of West Francia, received the western part, which included Meuse, thus effectively establishing the medieval Kingdoms of Germany and France.

The Battle of Sedan was fought in the western part of the department during the Franco-Prussian War in 1870. It resulted in the capture of the Emperor Napoleon III and large numbers of his troops and effectively decided the war in favour of Prussia and its allies. The area was again a battleground in World War I when the Battle of Verdun was fought in 1916. In the Second World War it again saw action in another battle when the Germans sought to establish a base from which to capture the Meuse bridges and cross the river.

Geography

Meuse is a department in northeastern France and is part of the region of Grand Est. The capital and largest town in the department is Bar-le-Duc, and other large towns are Commercy and Verdun. The northern edge of the department is on the border with Belgium, to the east lies the department of Meurthe-et-Moselle, to the south lies Vosges, to the southwest lies Haute-Marne, to the west lies Marne and to the northwest, Ardennes. The main rivers flowing through the department are the River Meuse, the Aire and the Chiers. A ridge running from south to north separates the watersheds of the Seine and the Rhine. These hills are called the Argonne and are clothed in oak forests.

The principal crops grown are wheat, barley and oats, potatoes, oilseed rape, vegetables and fruit. Livestock is raised and timber is extracted from the forests. The main industries are brewing and the manufacture of glass and tiles. Lace-making is a traditional craft in the department.

Part of the department is in the Lorraine Regional Natural Park, a stretch of pastoral countryside stretching eastward from Metz and Nancy and spanning three departments. The park has many natural habitats including calcareous grassland, forested valleys, wet meadows, ponds and streams. There are many Natura 2000 protected areas and it is an important resting area for migratory birds. Among the different habitats it includes a stretch of coast, the plain of Woëvre, the Lac de Madine, the Meuse valley and the Hague plateau. It has a very small border with Belgium.

Demographics

Since the mid-nineteenth century, the exodus of the countryside inhabitants to the cities has caused the population of rural France to fall. Meuse has no big cities to receive population and the total population of the department has thus decreased. It reached 328,657 inhabitants in 1851, but had fallen to 277,955 by 1911. The First World War dealt a heavy blow to the department, and by 1921, only 207,309 inhabitants were recorded. Many residents had fled, and entire villages that were on or near the front line in 1916 were destroyed. Meuse thus has several uninhabited communes because the villages were never rebuilt, and in fact are known as "Morts pour la France" ("Died for France"); the number of displaced persons from the villages varies from 131 to 718. Since the end of the Battle of Verdun in 1916, these communes have been unoccupied with an official population of zero; the villages are Beaumont-en-Verdunois, Bezonvaux, Cumières-le-Mort-Homme, Fleury-devant-Douaumont, Haumont-près-Samogneux and Louvemont-Côte-du-Poivre. In the later part of the twentieth century, the number of inhabitants in the department has varied little, but eventually fell below 200,000 inhabitants in the 1980s.

Because of its low population density, Meuse is considered to fall within the empty diagonal.

Principal towns

The most populous commune is Verdun; the prefecture Bar-le-Duc is the second-most populous. As of 2019, there are 5 communes with more than 4,000 inhabitants:

Politics

The president of the Departmental Council is Jérôme Dumont, elected in July 2021.

Presidential elections 2nd round

Current National Assembly Representatives

Tourism

The European Beer Museum (Musée Européen de la bière) in Stenay, founded in 1986, is considered the largest of its kind on the continent.

See also 

 Cantons of the Meuse department
 Communes of the Meuse department
 Arrondissements of the Meuse department
 Departmental Council of Meuse

References

External links 

 Prefecture website 
 Meuse Departmental Council website
 Official Tourist Board website

 
1790 establishments in France
Departments of Grand Est
States and territories established in 1790